The men's team foil was one of eight fencing events on the fencing at the 1960 Summer Olympics programme. It was the tenth appearance of the event. The competition was held on 2 September 1960. 77 fencers from 16 nations competed.

Competition format 
The competition combined pool play with knockout rounds, a change from prior tournaments which used pool play all the way through. The first round consisted of pools, with the 18 teams entered in the competition divided into 6 pools of 3 teams. The top 2 teams in each pool after a round-robin advanced. Sweden and Spain did not start, leaving 2 of the pools with only 2 teams. The 12 teams remaining after the pool play competed in a four-round single-elimination bracket, with a bronze medal match between the semifinal losers. The winners of the first 4 pools received byes in the round of 16.

Each team match consisted of each of the four fencers on one team facing each fencer on the other team, for a maximum of 16 total bouts. An 8–8 tie would be resolved by touches received. Bouts were to 5 touches. Only as much fencing was done as was necessary to determine pool placement (in the first round) or the winning team (in the knockout rounds), so not all matches went to the full 16 bouts but instead stopped early (typically when one team had 9 bouts won).

Rosters

Australia
 Brian McCowage
 Michael Sichel
 Zoltan Okalyi
 David McKenzie

Belgium
 Jacques Debeur
 André Verhalle
 François Dehez
 Franck Delhem

France
 Jacky Courtillat
 Jean-Claude Magnan
 Guy Barrabino
 Claude Netter
 Christian d'Oriola

Germany
 Jürgen Brecht
 Tim Gerresheim
 Eberhard Mehl
 Jürgen Theuerkauff

Great Britain
 Bill Hoskyns
 Allan Jay
 Ralph Cooperman
 Angus McKenzie
 René Paul

Hungary
 Ferenc Czvikovszki
 Jenő Kamuti
 Mihály Fülöp
 László Kamuti
 József Gyuricza
 József Sákovics

Italy
 Edoardo Mangiarotti
 Luigi Carpaneda
 Alberto Pellegrino
 Mario Curletto
 Aldo Aureggi

Japan
 Heizaburo Okawa
 Mitsuyuki Funamizu
 Tsugeo Ozawa
 Kazuhiko Tabuchi

Luxembourg
 Jean Link
 Robert Schiel
 Édouard Didier
 Roger Theisen
 Jean-Paul Olinger

Morocco
 Charles El-Gressy
 Abderraouf El-Fassy
 Abderrahman Sebti
 Abbes Harchi
 Mohamed Ben Joullon
 Jacques Ben Gualid

Poland
 Egon Franke
 Ryszard Parulski
 Jan Różycki
 Ryszard Kunze
 Witold Woyda

Romania
 Iosif Szilaghi
 Sorin Poenaru
 Attila Csipler
 Tănase Mureșanu

Soviet Union
 Viktor Zhdanovich
 Yury Sisikin
 Mark Midler
 German Sveshnikov
 Yury Rudov

United Arab Republic
 Farid El-Ashmawi
 Moustafa Soheim
 Mohamed Gamil El-Kalyoubi
 Ahmed El-Hamy El-Husseini
 Sameh Abdel Rahman
 Ahmed Zein El-Abidin

United States
 Eugene Glazer
 Hal Goldsmith
 Joseph Paletta, Jr.
 Albie Axelrod
 Daniel Bukantz

Venezuela
 Luis García
 Freddy Quintero
 Augusto Gutiérrez
 Jesús Gruber

Results

Round 1

Pool A 
Luxembourg defeated Australia, as did France. This eliminated Australia; Luxembourg and France faced off to determine their placing within the group. Luxembourg took first in the group with a win over France.

Pool B 
Sweden was entered in this pool but did not start. Both Hungary and the United Arab Republic were guaranteed advancement; they faced each other to determine placing. Hungary were the winners.

Pool C 
Spain was entered in this pool but did not start. Both Italy and Romania were guaranteed advancement; they faced off to determine placing. Italy prevailed.

Pool D 
Belgium defeated Japan, followed by the Soviet Union also defeating Japan. This eliminated Japan; Belgium and the Soviet Union faced off to determine placing. The Soviets won.

Pool E 
Great Britain and then Germany each defeated Venezuela, eliminating the South Americans. Germany won over Great Britain to determine placement.

Pool F 
Poland defeated Morocco, followed by the United States defeating Morocco. The United States then defeated Poland to determine placement within the group.

Elimination rounds 

 Germany and France tied on both bouts and touches received, so a one-bout fence-off was conducted. Germany's Gerresheim defeated France's d'Oriola, 5–0.

Final classification

References

Foil team
Men's events at the 1960 Summer Olympics